Jezreel De Jesús (born 5 May 1991) is a Puerto Rican basketball player for Real Estelí of the Liga Superior de Baloncesto (LSB). He is also a member of the Puerto Rico national basketball team. De Jesús has played for several teams of in Puerto Rico, and has also played in Argentina, Qatar, Venezuela, Mexico, Colombia and Nicaragua.

Early and college career
De Jesús started playing basketball at age 5 in his hometown Carolina. Later, he traveled to Miami and later played for Western Oklahoma State College.

Professional career
De Jesús started his career with Leones de Ponce in the Puerto Rican .

In 2015, he played with Barrancabermeja Ciudad Futuro in the Colombian League where he was named the Most Valuable Player of the season.

In the 2021 BCL Americas season, De Jesús was the top scorer of the league after averaging 20.1 points per game. On 14 April, De Jesus scored a game-high 26 points in the final of the 2021 BCL Americas. However, Estelí could not overcome Flamengo and lost the game narrowly.

Awards and accomplishments

Club
Real Estelí
2× Liga Superior de Baloncesto: (2020, 2021)

Individual
BCL Americas Top Scorer: (2021)
Venezuelan League Top Scorer: (2015)
Baloncesto Profesional Colombiano MVP: (2014)

References

External links
Jezreel De Jesus at Proballers
Jezreel De Jesus at Latinbasket

People from Carolina, Puerto Rico
Point guards
1991 births
Puerto Rican men's basketball players
Fuerza Regia de Monterrey players
Leones de Ponce basketball players
Indios de Mayagüez basketball players
Capitanes de Arecibo players
Real Estelí Baloncesto players
Living people